Photographic Memory is a 2011 documentary film by independent filmmaker Ross McElwee about a voyage back to the roots of his involvement with the camera.

Photographic Memory premiered at the 2011 Venice Film Festival and won the Sheffield Youth Jury Award at Sheffield Doc/Fest in June 2012.

Synopsis
The filmmaker finds himself in frequent conflict with his son, who is no longer the delightful child the father loved, but an argumentative young adult who inhabits virtual worlds available through the internet. To the father, the son seems to be addicted to and permanently distracted by those worlds. The filmmaker undertakes a journey to St. Quay-Portrieux in Brittany where he worked for a spring as a wedding photographer's assistant at age 24 –slightly older than his son is now. He has not been back to St. Quay since that visit, and hopes to gain some perspective on what his own life was like when he was his son's age. He also hopes to track down his former employer, a fascinating Frenchman named Maurice, and Maud, a woman with whom he was romantically involved during that spring 38 years ago. Photographic Memory is a meditation on the passing of time, the praxis of photography and film, digital versus analog, and the fractured love of a father for his son.

References

External links

Venice Horizons selections include Jonathan Demme, Ross McElwee docs at ScreenDaily.com
Review of Photographic Memory at ScreenDaily.com

2011 films
French documentary films
American documentary films
Films directed by Ross McElwee
2011 documentary films
Autobiographical documentary films
Documentary films about photographers
2010s English-language films
2010s American films
2010s French films